The GT4 (from German: Gelenktriebwagen 4-achsig, which translates as 4-axle articulated tramcar) is an articulated tram vehicle built by Maschinenfabrik Esslingen from 1959 until 1965.

History
380 GT4 trams were produced of which 350 were delivered to the Stuttgarter Strassenbahnen, the public transport operator of Stuttgart. The remaining 30 vehicles were delivered to Freiburg (19), Neunkirchen (Saar) (8) and Reutlingen (3). The 350 Stuttgart-vehicles were uni-directional, had three double-doors, and were built to  gauge. The remaining cars were bi-directional and built with  gauge, with the exception of the Neunkirchen cars, which were built to  standard gauge. They also had four powered axles whereas two powered axles was the standard variant. Tram services in Neunkirchen ended in 1978.

With 86 trams in service, as of 2021, the largest operator of GT4 is CTP, the public transport company in Iași, Romania.

Technical specifications

The GT4 was developed because the longer six-axle articulated trams with Jacobs bogies, such as the GT6, were not suitable for the Stuttgart network, which had a large number of sharp curves and steep gradients due to the city's hilly topography.

The design of articulation is unique: Both bogies are connected by an underframe, upon which the two halves of the tram body rest. When the tram drives around a curve, the underframe prevents the body from overhanging the inside of the curve, allowing tighter clearances and more flexibility than a non-articulated tram.

On all except the Neunkirchen vehicles only the inner axles on each bogie were powered, therefore the wheel notation was (1A)(A1). Two thirds of the vehicle weight were rested on both powered axles.

The bi-directional variants have a second driver's cab and additional side doors, unlike the uni-directional models.

Trailers
The GT4 can operate in multiple. Some vehicles had powered trailers and therefore, no driver's cab. This was the case with 24 vehicles of the first series, 30 in the second series, 98 in the third and fourth series and eight in the fifth series, altogether 180 coaches were affected.

Sale to other cities
As Stuttgart put the Stuttgart Stadtbahn standard gauge light rail system in operation from 1985 onwards, some surplus GT4 cars were sold to other cities:

 Iași (Romania) - 107 cars
 Augsburg - 40 cars (23 cars later resold to Iași)
 Halle - 38 cars (27 cars later resold to Iași)
 Nordhausen - 12 cars (3 cars later resold to Iași)
 Fukui via Kōchi (Japan)  - 2 cars (Joined, see details below)
 Ulm, Halberstadt, Brandenburg an der Havel and Arad (Romania) - unspecified numbers

Some vehicles were destroyed or damaged beyond repair during a great fire in the Feuerbach depot in Stuttgart in 1986.

One Iași tram was rebuilt in 2013 by Electroputere VFU as type GT4M.

The bi-directional cars originally delivered to Reutlingen (59,60 and 61) were later sold to Ulm. The Ulm workshop rebuilt them to unidirectional cars (11, 12 and 13).

In 1989, a longer car set was rebuilt just before being exported to Japan: Two unidirectional vehicles (SSB 714 and 735) were joined together as one bi-directional vehicle. The vehicle had no additional doors, so only the two doors in the direction of travel got available, which, however, suit the Japanese tram fare collecting system. Also, they were regauged to fit into the 1,067 mm (3 ft 6 in) gauge. They were exported and used by Tosa Denki Tetsudō, then sold to and now being operated by Fukui Railway as their type F10 tram under the nickname .

References

External links

 GT4 series

Tram vehicles of Germany
Transport in Stuttgart